Storavan is a lake in Norrbotten County, Lapland, Sweden, southeast of Lake Uddjaure, above sea level.

Lakes of Norrbotten County
Skellefte River basin